The Burial Plot Bidding War is the first EP by American metalcore band Every Time I Die. Songs "Prom Song" and "Your Touch Versus Death" were previously on their  1999 demo tape.  The EP was first released on Good Fellow Records in January 2000, then reissued by Undecided Records in June 2004 with different artwork.

Track listing
"The Emperor's New Clothes" – 4:53
"Your Touch Versus Death" – 3:35
"Prom Song" – 3:51
"Home Is Where You Hang Yourself" – 4:09
"Morphine Season" – 3:29

Note: At the beginning of "Prom Song" is an audio sample from Event Horizon which includes the Latin phrase "Liberate tutemet ex inferis".

Personnel
Keith Buckley- Vocals
Andrew Williams - Guitar
Jordan Buckley - Guitar
John McCarthy - Bass
Sean Hughes - Drums

References

Every Time I Die albums
2000 EPs
Undecided Records EPs